A referendum on political reforms was held in Andorra on 28 October 1977. Voters were presented with six options, but none received a majority and over 30% of votes cast were left blank. A second referendum on political reform was held the following year.

Background
In February 1977, the General Council and the Co-Princes agreed to political reforms, putting forward six options to voters:

Results

References

1977 referendums
1977 in Andorra
Referendums in Andorra
Constitutional referendums
Reform in Andorra
October 1977 events in Europe
Multiple-choice referendums